Cédric Tousch (born 29 May 1989) is a retired French kickboxer and Nak Muay. He is the former WBC Muaythai World Light Heavyweight champion and the former WAKO World Light Heavyweight K-1 champion.

He is also the former WMC and ICO European Light Heavyweight champion, as well as the FFSCDA champion.

Martial arts career
In March 2015 Tousch fought a rematch with Djibril Ehouo, with the WMC European belt on the line. Toushch won the belt after five rounds, through a unanimous decision. Winning the continental title allowed Toush to fight Malyck Tavares for the WBC Muaythai World Light Heavyweight title. He won the fight by a unanimous decision.

This fight gained Tousch notoriety in the kickboxing world and earned him a chance to fight with Glory. In his sole appearance with the organization he fought Cyril Benzaquen during Glory 28, winning the fight by a unanimous decision. In his next fight he would again win a unanimous decision, this time against Khalid El Bakouri during King Of The Ring 5.

Following this streak, Tousch was given a chance to fight Gabriele Casella for the WAKO K-1 Light Heavyweight title. Casella was forced to withdraw from the fight and was replaced by Aleksandar Petrov. Tousch won the fight by a unanimous decision.

After this he fought his sole fight with Kunlun Fight. He faced Dmitry Valent during Kunlun Fight 51. Tousch lost for the second time in his professional career, dropping a decision.

His last professional bout was a title defense of the WBC Muaythai belt. He won a unanimous decision over Aydin Tuncay, ending his career on a win.

Championships and accomplishments
Fédération Française de Kick Boxing, Muaythaï et Disciplines Associées
2012 FFSCDA National Muay Thai Light Heavyweight Championship
International Federation of Muaythai Associations
2012 IFMA World Championships -81kg Gold Medal
International Combat Organization
2012 ICO European Light Heavyweight Championship
World Muaythai Council
2015 WMC European Light Heavyweight Championship
World Boxing Council Muaythai
2016 WBC Muaythai World Light Heavyweight Championship 
One successful title defense
World Association of Kickboxing Organizations
2016 WAKO World K-1 Light Heavyweight Championship

Fight record

|-  style="background:#cfc;"
| 2017-02-04|| Win ||align=left| Aydin Tuncay || La Nuit Des Challenges 17 || Mulhouse, France || Decision (Unanimous) || 5 || 3:00 
|-
! style=background:white colspan=9 |
|-  style="background:#fbb;"
| 2016-08-10|| Loss ||align=left| Dmitry Valent || Kunlun Fight 51 || Fuzhou, China || Decision (Unanimous) || 4 || 3:00
|-  style="background:#cfc;"
| 2016-06-24|| Win ||align=left| Aleksandar Petrov || Monte-Carlo Fighting Masters || Monaco, Monaco || Decision (Unanimous) || 5 || 3:00 
|-
! style=background:white colspan=9 |
|-  style="background:#cfc;"
| 2016-04-09|| Win ||align=left| Khalid El Bakouri || King Of The Ring 5 || Longeville-lès-Metz, France || Decision (Unanimous) || 3 || 3:00
|-  style="background:#cfc;"
| 2016-03-12|| Win ||align=left| Cyril Benzaquen || Glory 28 || Paris, France || Decision (Unanimous) || 3 || 3:00
|-  style="background:#cfc;"
| 2016-02-27|| Win ||align=left| Malyck Tavares || La Grande Soirée de la Boxe || La Riche, France || Decision (Unanimous) || 5 || 3:00 
|-
! style=background:white colspan=9 |
|-  style="background:#fbb;"
| 2015-09-12|| Loss ||align=left| Artur Kyshenko || It's Fight Time 2 || Darmstadt, Germany || Decision (Unanimous) || 3 || 3:00
|-  style="background:#cfc;"
| 2015-06-13|| Win ||align=left| Mbamba Cauwenbergh || Championnat du Monde WKN K1 Rules || Strasbourg, France || Decision (Unanimous) || 3 || 3:00
|-  style="background:#cfc;"
| 2015-06-13|| Win ||align=left| Omer Kocak || La Nuit des Guerriers || Bitche, France || KO || 1 ||
|-  style="background:#cfc;"
| 2015-03-14|| Win ||align=left| Djibril Ehouo || Grande Soirée de la Boxe || La Riche, France || Decision (Unanimous) || 5 || 3:00 
|-
! style=background:white colspan=9 |
|-  style="background:#cfc;"
| 2015-01-31|| Win ||align=left| Madani Rahmani || Emperor Chok Dee || Vandœuvre-lès-Nancy, France || TKO (Injury) || 2 || 3:00
|-  style="background:#cfc;"
| 2014-05-17|| Win ||align=left| Sofian Mwayembe || Radikal Fight Night 2 || Charleville-Mézières, France || TKO (Retirement) || 2 || 3:00
|-  style="background:#cfc;"
| 2014-03-01|| Win ||align=left| Imanol Rodriguez || La Nuit des Spartiates IV || Sarreguemines, France || Decision (Unanimous) || 3 || 3:00
|-  style="background:#cfc;"
| 2014-02-01|| Win ||align=left| Djibril Ehouo || Grande Soirée de la Boxe, Tournament Final || La Riche, France || Decision (Unanimous) || 3 || 3:00
|-
! style=background:white colspan=9 |
|-  style="background:#cfc;"
| 2014-02-01|| Win ||align=left| Niklas Karlsson || Grande Soirée de la Boxe, Tournament Semifinal || La Riche, France || Decision (Unanimous) || 3 || 3:00 
|-
|-  style="background:#cfc;"
| 2013-11-02|| Win ||align=left| Janosch Nietlispach || Elite Fight Night, Tournament Final || Heidenheim, Germany || TKO || 2 ||
|-
! style=background:white colspan=9 |
|-  style="background:#cfc;"
| 2013-11-02|| Win ||align=left| Simon Hinkle || Elite Fight Night, Tournament Semifinal || Heidenheim, Germany || Decision (Unanimous) || 3 || 3:00 
|-
|-  style="background:#cfc;"
| 2013-06-29|| Win ||align=left| Sébastien Laplane || Red Devil Muay Thai Ultimate || Freyming-Merlebach, France || TKO (Injury) || 3 ||
|-  style="background:#cfc;"
| 2013-06-08|| Win ||align=left| Falk Monzeel || La Voie des champions || Oberkorn, Luxembourg || Decision (Unanimous) || 3 || 3:00
|-  style="background:#cfc;"
| 2013-06-01|| Win ||align=left| Laurent Atrifi || Le Défi Lorrain || Epinal, France || Decision (Unanimous) || 3 || 3:00
|-  style="background:#cfc;"
| 2013-05-04|| Win ||align=left| Mehmet Arslan || King of the Ring 2 || Longeville-lès-Metz, France || TKO (Retirement) || 3 ||
|-  style="background:#cfc;"
| 2013-03-09|| Win ||align=left| Raouf Nouainia || Grande Soirée de la Boxe || La Riche, France || TKO || 2 ||
|-  style="background:#cfc;"
| 2013-01-26|| Win ||align=left| Imanol Rodriguez || Nuit des Spartiates III || Sarreguemines, France || Decision (Unanimous) || 3 || 3:00
|-  style="background:#cfc;"
| 2012-10-27|| Win ||align=left| Herman Nolga || King's of the Ring 2 || Châlons-en-Champagne, France || Decision (Unanimous) || 3 || 3:00 
|-
! style=background:white colspan=9 |
|-  style="background:#cfc;"
| 2012-07-07 || Win ||align=left| Dimitri Menchanikov || Fight Night || Offenbourg, Germany || KO || 2 ||
|-  style="background:#cfc;"
| 2012-05-05 || Win ||align=left| Fatah Abderrezak || King of the Ring || Longeville-lès-Metz, France || KO || 2 ||   
|-
! style=background:white colspan=9 |
|-  style="background:#cfc;"
| 2012-03-17 || Win ||align=left| Amadou N'Diaye || 1/2 finales Championnat de France de Muaythai || Dreux, France || KO || 3 ||
|-  style="background:#cfc;"
| 2011-11-12 || Win ||align=left| Malik Aliane || Nuit des Spartiates II || Sarreguemines, France || KO || 1 ||  
|-
| colspan=9 | Legend:    

|-  style="background:#cfc"
| 2012-09-15 || Win ||align=left| Lukas Wolf || 2012 IFMA World Championships, Tournament Final || Saint Petersburg, Russia || TKO (Doctor's stoppage) ||  ||  
|-
! style=background:white colspan=9 |
|-
|-  style="background:#cfc"
| 2012-09-13 || Win ||align=left| Turgut Kocakaya || 2012 IFMA World Championships, Tournament Semifinal || Saint Petersburg, Russia || TKO (Doctor's stoppage) ||  ||  
|-
|-  style="background:#cfc"
| 2012-09-11 || Win ||align=left| Kim Nielsen || 2012 IFMA World Championships, Tournament Quarterfinal || Saint Petersburg, Russia || Decision || 3 || 2:00  
|-
|-  style="background:#cfc"
| 2012-09-09 || Win ||align=left| Lyrshchikov Evgeniy || 2012 IFMA World Championships, Tournament Opening Round || Saint Petersburg, Russia || Decision || 3 || 2:00  
|-
| colspan=9 | Legend:

See also
 List of male kickboxers

References 

 1989 births
 People from Schiltigheim
French male kickboxers
French Muay Thai practitioners
Living people
Light heavyweight kickboxers
Sportspeople from Bas-Rhin